Pila ampullacea, is a species of freshwater snail with an operculum, an aquatic gastropod mollusk in the family Ampullariidae, the apple snails.

Distribution
Thailand, Vietnam, Indonesia

Description

As food
Pila ampullacea, together with Pila pesmei, are indigenous rice field snail species traditionally eaten in Thailand that have been displaced by the invasive golden apple snail, Pomacea canaliculata.
In Indonesia, it is famous as keong sawah or tutut as traditional cuisine which is often boiled or grilled as satay.

References

External links 
 Linnaeus, C. (1758). Systema Naturae per regna tria naturae, secundum classes, ordines, genera, species, cum characteribus, differentiis, synonymis, locis. Editio decima, reformata [10th revised edition, vol. 1: 824 pp. Laurentius Salvius: Holmiae]

 Applesnail.net info

Ampullariidae
Gastropods described in 1758
Taxa named by Carl Linnaeus